Vacas may refer to:

Vacas, a Spanish film

Places
 Vacas, Villalba, Puerto Rico, a barrio
 Vacas Municipality, a municipality of Bolivia
 Vacas, Cochabamba, a Bolivian village
 Vacas Heladas River, a river in Chile